Richard Fielder (1758–1826) was an English cricketer who played in 20 matches between 1790 and 1801 which are now regarded as having first-class cricket status.

Fielder was born at East Malling in Kent in 1758. He is first known to have played cricket in 1790, playing in a first-class match for East Kent against West Kent at Bourne Paddock near Canterbury. He played regularly for Kent sides and for England teams between 1792 and 1796. A total of 18 of his 20 first-class matches were played during these seasons, 11 for Kent, six for England as well as one for a team organised by Richard Leigh, an influential organiser of matches who lived in the Dartford area of Kent.

From 1801 to 1803 Fielder played for Surrey teams, including in one match which has been awarded first-class status. Writing in 1862, Arthur Haygarth recorded that he has been considered "a very fine field and catch". In his 20 matches considered to be first-class, Fielder scored 281 runs with a highest score of 35. He took at least one wicket.

Fielder worked as a horse trainer and is thought to have eloped with one of his riding pupils. Afterwards they kept the Woolpack Inn at Tenterden. He died at Gravesend in 1826.

Notes

References

External links

1758 births
1826 deaths
English cricketers
English cricketers of 1787 to 1825
Kent cricketers
People from East Malling
Surrey cricketers
R. Leigh's XI cricketers
West Kent cricketers